Galin (also Romanized as Galīn and Golīn; also known as Gailiān, Golshan, and Takyeh-ye Galīn) is a village in Zhavarud-e Sharqi Rural District, in the Central District of Sanandaj County, Kurdistan Province, Iran. At the 2006 census, its population was 1,560, in 389 families. The village is populated by Kurds.

References 

Towns and villages in Sanandaj County
Kurdish settlements in Kurdistan Province